Arthur W. (Bud) Vervaet, Jr. (July 10, 1913 – November 20, 1999) was an American Republican Party politician who served four terms in the New Jersey General Assembly.

Born in Pompton Lakes, New Jersey, Vervaet graduated from Butler High School in 1931 and from the University of Notre Dame in 1936. He served in the U.S. Army during World War II.  He was employed by W.R. Grace and Company, and then for the Vervaet Woven Label, a New Jersey-based family business.

He was elected Councilman in Oakland, New Jersey in 1950, and served as Mayor of Oakland from 1952 to 1953.  He was elected to the New Jersey General Assembly in 1951, and was re-elected in 1953, 1955 and 1957.  He was elected to the Bergen County, New Jersey Board of Chosen Freeholders in 1958 and resigned his Assembly seat after taking office in 1959.  He was re-elected Freeholder in 1961.  In 1965, Vervaet became a candidate for the New Jersey State Senate.  Backed by the Republican County Chairman, Walter H. Jones, he won a hotly contested Republican Primary in which the incumbent Senator, Pierce H. Deamer Jr., who defeated for renomination.  Vervaet received 10,519 more votes than Deamer.  But Vervaet lost the General Election in what turned out to be a heavily Democratic year.  He trailed Alfred Kiefer by nearly 8,000 votes.  He was married to Dorothy Ryerson MacEvoy Vervaet (1921-1973) and had three children: Gay, Alden, and Karen.

1965 Republican Primary for State Senator - Bergen County - Four Seats

References

1913 births
1999 deaths
Republican Party members of the New Jersey General Assembly
County commissioners in New Jersey
New Jersey city council members
Mayors of places in New Jersey
University of Notre Dame alumni
United States Army personnel of World War II
People from Oakland, New Jersey
People from Pompton Lakes, New Jersey
Politicians from Passaic County, New Jersey
20th-century American politicians